"Tell Me" is the debut single by Dru Hill. In the US, the song peaked at number 18 on the Billboard Hot 100 and number five on the R&B chart. It sold 600,000 copies domestically, earning a gold certification from the RIAA. It reached number 30 on the UK Singles Chart. The song is also the first single from the group's eponymous debut album.

The song first appeared on the soundtrack of the 1996 film, Eddie. The music video was filmed in September and premiered on T.V. two months later.

The group also performed the song while guest-starring in the third-season premiere of the American sitcom Moesha aired in August 1997, as well as a fourth-season episode of another sitcom, The Parent 'Hood, aired in November 1997, in which they sang acapella and during its closing credits.

Music video
The music video, directed by Terry Heller, features the group performing the song in a club.

Track listing

Charts

Weekly charts

Year-end charts

Certifications

References

1996 debut singles
Dru Hill songs
Island Records singles
1996 songs